Teruo Misawa (born 11 December 1978) is a Japanese former professional boxer who competed from 1998 to 2008. He held the Japanese mini-flyweight title from 2006 to 2007 and challenged for the WBC interim mini-flyweight title in 2008.

Professional career
Misawa made his debut in 1998 with a win over Yuji Kogure. In his nineteenth bout, Satoshi Kogumazaka narrowly defeated Misawa by a close unanimous decision (UD) to retain his Japanese mini-flyweight title in March 2005. After an August 2006 rematch for the now vacant title ended in a split draw (SD), Misawa finally defeated Kogumazaka to win the title by UD in December 2006. Misawa lost the title in his first defense to Yasutaka Kuroki in May 2007 by unanimous technical decision (TD). After Kuroki defeated Misawa in a rematch, WBC interim champion Juan Palacios defeated Misawa by seventh-round technical knockout (TKO) to retain his title in November 2008.

Professional boxing record

External links
 

1978 births
Living people
Japanese male boxers
Mini-flyweight boxers